Rock is an English and German surname, a given name and a nickname.

Surname

Politicians and activists
 Allan Rock (born 1947), Canadian Justice Minister, Health Minister and diplomat
 Heraldine Rock (1933–2012), Saint Lucian politician
 John Rock (abolitionist) (1825–1866), American abolitionist
 Raymond Rock (1922-2016), Canadian politician

Scientists
 John Rock (American scientist) (1890–1984), one of the inventors of the contraceptive pill
 Joseph Rock (1884-1962), Austrian-American explorer, geographer and botanist
 Irvin Rock (1922–1995), American experimental psychologist, known for The Logic of Perception

Entertainers
 Bob Rock (born 1954), Canadian musician, sound engineer and record producer
 Chris Rock (born 1965), American comedian and actor
 Dave Rock, musician of American band Rilo Kiley
 Kid Rock (born 1971), American singer-songwriter, rapper, disc jockey, musician, record producer, and actor
 Jay Rock, American rapper and songwriter

Athletes
 Andrew Rock (born 1982), American sprinter
 Claude Rock (1863–1950), Australian cricketer
 David Rock (cricketer) (born 1957), English cricketer
 Gene Rock (1921–2002), American professional basketball player
 George Rock (cricketer) (born 1936), Barbadian cricketer
 Katie Rock (born 2003), Albanian swimmer
 Owen Rock (1896–1978), Australian cricketer, son of Claude
 Robert Rock (born 1977), English professional golfer

Other professions
 Anthony J. Rock, U.S. Air Force Inspector General
 David Rock (architect) (born 1929), English architect and graphic designer
 David Rock (historian), British historian of Latin America who worked at the University of California
 Karl Rock, New Zealand YouTube personality and blogger
 Mick Rock (1948–2021), British photographer

Given name
 Rock or Roch (c. 1348 – c. 1379), Roman Catholic saint
 Rock F. Jones, 16th President of Ohio Wesleyan University
 Rock Hudson (1925–1985), born Roy Harold Scherer, American actor
 Rock Ya-Sin (born 1996), American football player

Nickname
 Devol Brett (1923–2010), U.S. Air Force lieutenant general
 Dwayne "The Rock" Johnson (born 1972), American/Canadian actor, producer, and professional wrestler
 Don Muraco (born 1949), American professional wrestler
 Nate Quarry (born 1972), American mixed martial artist
 Rock aka Blade Runner Rock, later The Ultimate Warrior (1959-2014), American professional wrestler
 Knute Rockne (1888-1931), Norwegian-American football player and coach
 Tim Raines (born 1959), American Major League Baseball player
 Larry "Rock" Zeidel (1928–2014), Canadian ice hockey player

See also
 Rock (disambiguation)

Lists of people by nickname
English-language surnames
German-language surnames